Lava Canyon Falls drops  along the Muddy River in Skamania County, Washington.

Formation
Lava Canyon Falls was discovered after the 1980 eruption of Mount St. Helens, from which a lahar and flood scoured out a canyon that had been filled with dirt and mud for 1,800 years. Lava Canyon Falls is the largest, 200-foot sheer drop.

Location

Sources
 http://www.waterfallsnorthwest.com/nws/waterfall.php?num=1048
 http://www.u-s-history.com/wa/l/lavacanf.htm
 http://www.fs.fed.us/gpnf/recreation/waterfalls/lava-canyon.shtml
 https://web.archive.org/web/20110717042424/http://www.thewaterfallcompanion.com/?page=Waterfall&id=254

Landforms of Skamania County, Washington
Waterfalls of Washington (state)
Gifford Pinchot National Forest
Waterfalls of Skamania County, Washington